This is the List of palaces and manor houses in Lithuania. This list does not include castles, which are listed in a separate article.

Akmenė District Municipality 
 Dabikinė Manor
 Kairiškiai Manor
 Keidai Manor
 Klaišiai Manor
 Kruopiai Manor
 Medemrodė Manor
 Paragiai Manor

Alytus District Municipality 
 Alovė Manor
 Dapkiškiai Manor
 Obelija Manor
 Pasimniai Manor
 Rodžia Manor

Anykščiai District Municipality 
 Akmena Manor
 Aknystos Manor
 Antalina Manor
 Anykščiai Manor
 Burbiškis Manor
 Jakšiškis Manor
 Janapolis Manor
 Jokūbava Manor
 Kavarskas Manor
 Kurkliai II Manor
 Laviškis Manor
 Pavirinčiai Manor
 Pelyšai I Manor
 Petkūnai Manor
 Pienionai Manor
 Raguvėlė Manor
 Savičiūnai Manor
 Sedeikiai Manor
 Šlavėnai Manor
 Svėdasai Manor
 Svirniai I Manor
 Troškūnai Manor (Smėlynė Manor),
 Vašuokėnai Manor

Birštonas Municipality 
 Jundeliškiai Manor
 Siponys Manor

Biržai District Municipality 
 Astravas Manor
 Butautai Manor
 Daudžgiriai Manor
 Didžioji Panemunė Manor
 Kraštai Manor
 Mantagailiškis Manor
 Pabiržė Manor (Balandiškiai Manor
 Panemunė Manor
 Papilys Manor
 Parovėja Manor
 Ringaudos Manor
 Skrebiškis Manor
 Velykionys Manor
 Zomkelis Manor

Druskininkai Municipality 
 Leipalingis Manor
 Panemunė Manor

Elektrėnai Municipality 
 Abromiškės Manor
 Ausieniškiai Manor
 Daugirdiškiai Manor
 Paneriai Manor
 Semeliškės Manor
 Vievis Manor

Ignalina District Municipality 
 Antaprūdė Manor
 Dūkštas Manor
 Griškiškė Manor
 Kazitiškis Manor
 Kazokinė Manor
 Krikonys Manor
 Meikštai Manor
 Pakiaunys Manor
 Paliesius Manor
 Vidiškiai Manor

Jonava District Municipality 
 Barborlaukis Manor
 Beržai Manor
 Bukonys Manor
 Daigučiai Manor
 Drobiškiai Manor
 Lokėnėliai Manor
 Markutiškiai Manor
 Mykoliškiai Manor
 Milagainiai Manor
 Mitėniškiai Manor
 Naujokai Manor
 Palankesiai Manor
 Skaruliai Manor
 Šilai Manor
 Vainiai Manor
 Žeimiai Manor
 Žemutinė Kulva Manor

Joniškis District Municipality 
 Daunorava Manor
 Jakiškiai Manor
 Jurdaičiai Manor
 Lazdyniškiai Manor
 Malgūžiai Manor
 Martyniškiai Manor
 Paaudruvė Manor
 Raudondvaris Manor
 Žagarė Manor

Jurbarkas District Municipality 
 Belvederis Manor
 Daugėliai Manor
 Jurbarkas Manor
 Lapgiriai Manor
 Padubysys Manor
 Panemunė Manor
 Raudonė Manor
 Veliuona Manor

Kaišiadorys District Municipality 
 Kaišiadorys Manor
 Kurniškiai Manor
 Mūro Strėvininkai Manor
 Stasiūnai Manor
 Tauckūnai Manor
 Triliškiai Manor
 Žasliai Manor
 Žiežmariai Manor

Kalvarija Municipality 
 Kalvarija Manor
 Mockava Manor
 Zigmantavas Manor

Kaunas 

 Old Kaunas Ducal Palace
 Siručiai Palace
 Zabieliai Palace
 Historical Presidential Palace, Kaunas
 Aukštosios Fredos dvaras, Aleksoto sen.
 Linkuva Manor
 Marva Manor
 Pažaislis Manor
 Romainys Manor
 Sargėnai Manor
 Tirkiliškiai Manor

Kaunas District Municipality 
 Babtynas Manor
 Bivyliai Manor
 Brūžė Manor
 Kačiūniškė Manor
 Krivėnai Manor
 Kudrėnai Manor
 Kvesos Manor
 Lapės Manor
 Noreikiškės Manor
 Padauguvėlė Manor
 Panevėžiukas Manor
 Puidinė Manor
 Raudondvaris Manor
 Šilelis Manor
 Stanislava Manor
 Viršužiglis Manor
 Vytėnai Manor
 Zacišius Manor
 Žvirgždė Manor

Kazlų Rūda Municipality 
 Antanavas Manor

Kėdainiai District Municipality 
 Akademija Manor
 Apytalaukis Manor
 Aristavas Manor
 Aukupėnai Manor
 Barkūniškis Manor
 Jasnagurka Manor
 Kalnaberžė Manor
 Kėdainiai Manor
 Lančiūnava Manor
 Lipliūnai Manor
 Naujaberžė Manor
 Paberžė Manor
 Pašumerys Manor
 Pašušvys Manor
 Pauslajas Manor
 Pavermenis Manor
 Piliamantas Manor
 Šetenai Manor
 Sirutiškis Manor
 Šlapaberžė Manor
 Stasinė Manor
 Sviliukai Manor
 Terespolis Manor
 Vaiškonys Manor
 Zavišinė Manor

Kelmė District Municipality 
 Beržėnai Manor
 Gelučiai Manor
 Graužikai Manor
 Kelmė Manor
 Kiaunoriai Manor
 Pagryžuvys Manor
 Pakėvys Manor
 Pavandenė Manor
 Šaukėnai Manor
 Šilo Pavėžupis Manor
 Tytuvėnėliai Manor
 Užvarmis Manor
 Užvenčys Manor
 Vaiguva Manor
 Verpena Manor

Klaipėda 
 Bachmanas Manor
 Gedminai Manor
 Paupys Manor
 Rumpiškė Manor
 Sendvaris Manor
 Tauralaukis Manor

Klaipėda District Municipality 
 Dovilai Manor
 Kalotė Manor
 Kiškėnai Manor
 Klemiškė Manor
 Kliošiai Manor
 Lankiškės Manor
 Lėbartai Manor
 Priekulė Manor
 Samališkė Manor
 Vėžaičiai Manor
 Žemgrindžiai Manor

Kretinga District Municipality 
 Aukštkalviai Manor
 Darbėnai Manor
 Dimitravas Manor
 Gaudučiiai Manor
 Genčiai Manor
 Jokūbavas Manor
 Kartena Manor
 Kašučiai Manor
 Kretinga Manor
 Laukžemė Manor
 Mažučiai Manor
 Mišučiai Manor
 Pesčiai Manor
 Pryšmančiai Manor
 Salantos Manor
 Šalynas Manor
 Tinteliai Manor
 Žadeikiai Manor

Kupiškis District Municipality 
 Adomynė Manor
 Antašava Manor
 Mirabelis Manor
 Noriūnai Manor
 Pajuodupė Manor
 Palėvenė Manor
 Salamiestis Manor
 Šetekšnai Manor
 Vaduvos Manor
 Zasinyčiai Manor

Lazdijai District Municipality 
 Aradninkai Manor
 Aštrioji Kirsna Manor
 Būdvietis Manor
 Bulakavas Manor
 Rudamina Manor
 Vainežeris Manor

Marijampolė Municipality 
 Bukta Manor
 Ivoniškis Manor
 Kvietiškis Manor
 Liūliškis Manor
 Riečius Manor
 Tautkaičius Manor
 Žydronys Manor

Mažeikiai District Municipality 
 Dautarai Manor
 Griežė Manor
 Kapėnai Manor
 Pavirvytė Manor
 Plinkšiai Manor
 Renavas Manor
 Ritinė Manor
 Sugaudžiai Manor
 Ukrinai Manor

Molėtai District Municipality 
 Alanta Manor
 Ambraziškiai Manor
 Anomislis Manor
 Arnionys Manor
 Baltadvaris Manor
 Bekupė Manor
 Bijutiškis Manor
 Čiuliai Manor
 Didžiokai Manor
 Dubingiai Manor
 Girsteikiškis Manor
 Inketrai Manor
 Klabiniai Manor
 Libertava Manor
 Martyniškės Manor
 Parudinė Manor
 Siesartis Manor
 Žalvariai Manor
 Želtiškiai Manor
 Žižmauka Manor

Pagėgiai Municipality 
 Būbliškė Manor
 Palumpiai Manor
 Pempynė Manor
 Šereitlaukis Manor
 Šilgaliai Manor
 Vilkyškiai Manor

Pakruojis District Municipality 
 Akmenėlių Manor (Pakruojis)
 Akmenėlių Manor (Žeimelis)
 Aukštadvario Manor
 Balsiai Manor
 Dovydiškis Manor
 Gedučiai Manor
 Geručiai Manor
 Impoliiai Manor
 Klovainiai Manor
 Lašmenpamūšis Manor
 Linksmučiai Manor
 Pakruojis Manor
 Pamūšys Manor (Linkuva)
 Pamūšys Manor (Pašvitinys)
 Pavėzgiai Manor
 Plonėnas Manor
 Rimkūnai Manor
 Vileišiai Manor

Palanga 
 Tiškevičiai Palace, Palanga
 Būtingė Manor
 Palanga Manor

Panevėžys 
 Skaistakalnis Manor

Panevėžys District Municipality 
 Alančiai Manor
 Aukštadvaris Manor
 Bygailiai Manor
 Bistrampolis Manor
 Daniliškis Manor
 Giniūnai Manor
 Jotainiai Manor
 Jutkoniai Manor
 Leonardava Manor
 Liberiškis Manor
 Linkavičiai Manor
 Liūdynė Manor
 Mitriūnai Manor
 Naudvaris Manor
 Pajuostė Manor
 Paliūniškis Manor
 Pamiškė Manor
 Puziniškis Manor
 Rodai II Manor
 Staniūnai Manor
 Ūdros Manor
 Upytė Manor
 Vadaktėliai Manor
 Vadaktai Manor

Pasvalys District Municipality 
 Ąžuolpamūšė Manor
 Baltpamūšis Manor
 Barklainiai Manor
 Dagilynė Manor
 Daniūnai Manor
 Daučkėnai Manor
 Didieji Grūžai Manor
 Geltonpamūšė Manor
 Gulbinėnai Manor
 Joniškėlis Manor
 Kamardė Manor
 Kaukliai Manor
 Kyburiai Manor
 Lavėnai Manor
 Moliūnai Manor
 Nairiai Manor
 Pajiešmeniai Manor
 Raudonpamūšė Manor
 Saločiai Manor
 Sokai Manor
 Škilinpamūšis Manor
 Švokštonys Manor
 Toliūnai Manor
 Žilpamūšis Manor

Plungė District Municipality 

 Bukantė Manor
 Gintališkė Manor
 Plateliai Manor
 Plungė Manor
 Šateikiai Manor
 Šventorkalnis Manor

Prienai District Municipality 
 Balbieriškis Manor
 Daukšiagirė Manor
 Jieznas Manor
 Lelioniai Manor
 Pagirmuonis Manor
 Patamulšis Manor
 Prienai Manor
 Rodomislė Manor

Radviliškis District Municipality 
 Amalija Manor
 Baisogala Manor
 Beinorava Manor
 Birželiai Manor
 Burbiškis Manor
 Diktariškiai Manor
 Gražioniai Manor
 Kurkliai Manor
 Maldžiūnai Manor
 Pakiršinis Manor
 Palonai Manor
 Polekėlė Manor
 Radvilonys Manor
 Ramulėnai Manor
 Raudondvario Manor
 Šaukotas Manor
 Šeduva Manor
 Šiaulėnai Manor
 Vadaktai Manor
 Viktorinė Manor
 Vileikiai Manor

Raseiniai District Municipality 
 Ariogala Manor
 Belazariškis Manor
 Biliūnai Manor
 Blinstrubiškiai Manor
 Burbiškiai Manor
 Gėluva Manor
 Katauskiai Manor
 Palukščiai Manor
 Plembergas Manor
 Ročiškė Manor
 Skaraitiškė Manor
 Tendžiogala Manor
 Žaiginis Manor
 Žibuliai Manor
 Žičkiškė Manor

Rietavas Municipality 
 Rietavas Manor

Rokiškis District Municipality 
 Aleksandravėlė Manor
 Antanašė Manor
 Aukštadvaris Manor
 Bagdoniškis Manor
 Čedasai Manor
 Gačioniai Manor
 Ilzenbergas Manor
 Kavoliškis Manor
 Kraštai Manor
 Obeliai Manor
 Onuškis Manor
 Pandėlis Manor
 Panemunis Manor
 Petrošiškis Manor
 Rokiškėliai Manor
 Rokiškis Manor
 Salos Manor
 Skemai Manor
 Tarnava Manor

Skuodas District Municipality 
 Dvaralis Manor
 Juodkaičiai Manor
 Kivyliai Manor
 Šarkė Manor
 Skuodas Manor

Šakiai District Municipality 
 Branduoliškiai Manor
 Daukantiškiai Manor
 Gelgaudiškiai Manor
 Ilguva Manor
 Kiduliai Manor
 Kriūkai Manor
 Pavilkija Manor
 Žemoji Panemunė Manor
 Zypliai Manor

Šalčininkai District Municipality 
 Gornostajiškiai Manor
 Jašiūnai Manor
 Merkinė Manor
 Mikniškiai Manor
 Norviliškiai Manor
 Šalčininkėliai Manor
 Šalčininkai Manor
 Tabariškiai Manor
 Verseka Manor
 Vilkiškis Manor

Šiauliai 
 Didžiadvaris Manor
 Gubernija Manor
 Rėkyva Manor
 Zokniai Manor

Šiauliai District Municipality 
 Aleksandrija Manor
 Bubiai Manor
 Gilvyčiai Manor
 Gruzdžiai Manor
 Kuršėnai Manor
 Kurtuvėnai Manor
 Mirskiškė Manor
 Naisiai Manor
 Paežeriai Manor
 Paliesiai Manor
 Varputėnai Manor

Šilalė District Municipality 
 Bijotai Manor
 Budriai Manor
 Labardžiai Manor
 Pajūris Manor
 Vaboliai Manor

Šilutė District Municipality 
 Macikai Manor
 Šilutė Manor
 Stempliai Manor
 Švėkšna Manor
 Vilkėnas Manor

Širvintos District Municipality 
 Astruvka Manor
 Bartkuškis Manor
 Čiobiškis Manor
 Gaideliai Manor
 Gelvonai Manor
 Juodė Manor
 Juodiškiai Manor
 Kernavė Manor
 Lapšiai Manor
 Lemantaučizna Manor
 Levaniškis II Manor
 Liukonys Manor
 Musninkai Manor
 Narvydiškis Manor
 Paširvintis I Manor
 Paširvintis II Manor
 Pociūnai Manor
 Sabališkės Manor
 Šešuolėliai I Manor
 Šešuolėliai II Manor
 Staškūniškis Manor
 Viršuliškės Manor

Švenčionys District Municipality 
 Cirkliškis Manor
 Januliškis Manor
 Kaltanėnai Manor
 Liubiškė Manor
 Naujadvaris Manor
 Punžionys Manor
 Račkiškė Manor
 Stanislavavas Manor
 Sudota Manor
 Šventa Manor
 Zalavas Manor

Tauragė District Municipality 
 Adakavas Manor
 Batakiai Manor
 Lankininkai Manor
 Lomiai Manor
 Oplankis Manor
 Pagramantis Manor
 Tauragė Manor
 Trepai Manor

Telšiai District Municipality 
 Biržuvėnai Manor
 Brėvikiai Manor
 Degaičiai Manor
 Džiuginėnai Manor
 Pašatrija Manor
 Pavirvyčiai Manor
 Siraičiai Manor
 Tryškiai Manor

Trakai District Municipality 
 Aukštadvaris Manor, Aukštadvario sen.
 Dusmenos Manor
 Gineitiškės Manor
 Kariotiškės Manor
 Lentvaris Manor
 Raipolis Manor
 Užutrakis Manor

Ukmergė District Municipality 
 Aukštieji Svirnai Manor
 Baleliai Manor
 Daumantiškiai Manor
 Jasiuliškis Manor
 Jurdonys Manor
 Kiškeliškis Manor
 Krikštėnai Manor
 Kurėnai Manor
 Laumėnai Manor
 Leonpolis Manor
 Lokinė Manor
 Lyduokiai Manor
 Mikailiškiai Manor
 Padvariai Manor
 Pamūšis Manor
 Paobelis Manor
 Šešuoliai Manor
 Siesikai Manor
 Sližiai Manor
 Šventupė Manor
 Taujėnai Manor
 Užugiris Manor
 Vaitkuškis Manor
 Vaivadiškiai Manor
 Vepriai Manor
 Žemaitkiemis Manor

Utena District Municipality 
 Avižieniai Manor
 Bikuškis Manor
 Degsnis Manor
 Jasoniai Manor
 Jotaučiai Manor
 Leliūnai Manor
 Noliškis Manor
 Saldutiškis Manor
 Tauragnai Manor
 Utenėlė Manor
 Utena Manor
 Užpaliai Manor
 Vaikutėnai Manor
 Vyžuonėliai Manor
 Vyžuonai Manor

Varėna District Municipality 
 Česukai Manor
 Liškiava Manor
 Mardasavas Manor
 Masališkiai Manor
 Navasodai Manor
 Nedzingė Manor
 Valkininkai Manor
 Martinava Manor

Vilkaviškis District Municipality 
 Alvitas Manor
 Bartninkai Manor
 Didvyžiai Manor
 Gižai Manor
 Kataučizna Manor
 Klampučiai Manor
 Paežeriai Manor
 Patilčiai Manor
 Puniška Manor
 Putinai Manor
 Rasiai Manor
 Rumokai Manor
 Šūkliai Manor
 Vilkaviškis Manor
 Vinkšnupiai Manor

Vilnius 
 Abramavičiai Palace
 Bžostovskiai Palace
 Chodkevičiai Palace
 Lopacinskiai Palace (Bernardinai st.)
 Lopacinskiai Palace (Skapo st.)
 Pac Palace
 Palace of the Grand Dukes of Lithuania
 Presidential Palace, Vilnius
 Raduškevičius Palace
 Radziwiłł Palace, Vilnius
 Sapieha Palace, Vilnius
 Seimas Palace
 Slushko Palace
 Šuazeliai Palace
 Tiškevičiai Palace (Vilnius)
 Tyzenhaus Palace
 Verkiai Palace
 Vileišis Palace
 Antaviliai Manor
 Kairėnai Manor
 Markučiai Manor
 Pilaitė Manor
 Pučkoriai Manor
 Trakų Vokė Manor
 Tuskulėnai Manor
 Verkiai Manor

Vilnius District Municipality 
 Anavilis Manor
 Bezdonys Manor
 Baltoji Vokė Manor
 Bareikiškiai Manor
 Buivydiškiai Manor
 Buivydžiai Manor
 Bukiškiai Manor
 Galinė Manor
 Glitiškiai Manor
 Jonėnai Manor
 Karvis Manor
 Kaušiadala Manor
 Liubavas Manor
 Maišiagala Manor
 Mozūriškiai Manor
 Nemėžis Manor
 Pailgė Manor
 Peteša Manor
 Pikeliškiai Manor
 Punžonys Manor
 Raudondvario Manor (Nemenčinė)
 Raudondvaris Manor (Riešė)
 Rudamina Manor
 Šriubiškiai Manor
 Sudervė Manor
 Šumskas Manor
 Sužioniai Manor
 Vėriškiai Manor
 Vyžulėnai Manor

Zarasai District Municipality 
 Antazavė Manor
 Astraučizna Manor
 Didžiadvaris Manor
 Kamariškiai Manor
 Luodžiai Manor
 Mukuliai Manor
 Narkyčiai Manor
 Raudinė Manor
 Smalvos Manor
 Stelmužė Manor
 Suviekas Manor
 Turmantas Manor
 Vasaknos Manor
 Žvilbučiai Manor

External links

 Lithuanian Department of Cultural Heritage under the Ministry of Culture

Palaces and manor houses

Lithuania
Palaces and manor houses